The Acreage is an unincorporated community located in Palm Beach County, Florida, United States, with a 2010 US Census Bureau population count of 38,704. It straddles the western fringes of the highly developed eastern portion of Palm Beach County and the agricultural-rural western portions. Its large, spacious home site lots, dirt roads and many wooded areas give the area a rural character, although it is widely considered to be an exurban outgrowth of the South Florida Metropolitan Area. The Acreage is located solely within the Indian Trail Improvement District, responsible for maintaining the road and drainage systems within its boundaries.

History
The Acreage was originally developed by Samuel Friedland and his development company, Royal Palm Beach Colony, Inc., with the name of Royal Palm Beach Colony, as a community to house workers that were employed by the nearby Callery Judge and Mecca Citrus Groves. Workers were given  lots and coupled with few land restrictions.

Isolated local flooding occurs yearly, leading sometimes to road closures, with Hurricane Irene being the most memorable to the area. The 2004 hurricane season, in which Hurricane Frances and Hurricane Jeanne struck the area in a three-week period, doing considerable damage to the older, wooden cottage style houses while the modern houses in the area received mostly cosmetic damage.

Demographics
It is also surrounded by several nature preserves, and the area blurs the line between rural and suburban. Rapid development of the area has caused a recent push for incorporation and is now notably more built up than nearby Loxahatchee Groves, which was incorporated as a town in 2006.

The Acreage's ZIP codes are 33411 (Royal Palm Beach), 33412 (West Palm Beach), and 33470 (Loxahatchee), all occurring in barely perceptible regions, resulting in much confusion even among the residents of the area. The area is known for its diverse foreign-born population, with English, Caribbean, and Vietnamese populations being most notable.

Economy
Commercial businesses, shopping and schools are mostly located on the fringes of the area, notably Northlake Boulevard/Coconut Boulevard and Orange Boulevard/Seminole Pratt Whitney Road, while the center of area is mostly residential with a few garden nurseries on the major streets.

A proposed post office is expected to open up in the 33412 area of the town along with a pharmacy, supermarket food chains, doctor's offices, and bank chains.

In April 2012, The Acreage Branch Library opened to serve the local community. The Acreage Branch is a 30,000-square-foot facility on Orange Blvd. just east of Seminole Pratt Whitney Road. It is the first LEED-certified county building. The branch has a variety of materials including CDs, DVDs, new arrivals, books, newspapers and magazines. There are four private study rooms and a larger group study room. Express lending stations for fast, efficient service. There are two-themed areas designed especially for children and teens with ample room for materials and comfortable seating. Study carrels and lounge seating areas throughout the branch. Special features include a family restroom with child-sized facilities.
The branch also features an Art in Public Places light sculpture, “Productive Light”, by Laura Haddad and Tom Drugan. The sculpture includes a suspended “orange tree” light sculpture, a photovoltaic system, an interactive “sun panel”. The branch has horse hitching post stations for those arriving on horseback.

McDonald's also recently made its home at the intersection of Seminole Pratt and Orange, next to Walgreens. Four country clubs are now included in the 33412 area of The Acreage including the exclusive Ibis Country Club where house prices can exceed $3 million.  Land taxes and insurance prices are among the highest in Palm Beach County, far surpassing those of anywhere else in the western communities.

Housing
The Minto Westlake housing development passed with 5 votes to begin construction building its 4,500-home community. While the new development expects to have an economic impact of over $1 billion over the next decade, it conflicts with the rural feel of The Acreage, and thus has been met with a mix of opposition and encouragement in the decision to develop. Westlake incorporated as a city in 2016.

Parks and recreation
The community features nine parks.
The Acreage Athletic League is the area's youth sports provider.

Acreage Community Park
Bob Hoefl Park
Citrus Grove Park
Coconut Park
Downers Park
Kidscape Park
Nicole Hornstein Equestrian Park
Sycamore Park
Temple Park

Education
The community is served by the School District of Palm Beach County.

Osceola Creek Middle School
Western Pines Middle School
Acreage Pines Elementary School
Frontier Elementary School
Golden Grove Elementary School
Pierce Hammock Elementary School
Planet Kids — Private School
ALLSTAR Kids - Private School
Palm Beach State College- Loxahatchee Groves Campus
 Seminole Ridge Community High School

Media
The area is served by the Sun-Sentinel, West Palm Beach WPTV-TV, Radio, the Town-Crier and The Palm Beach Post.

Infrastructure

Transportation
There are a few major paved roads in the community, with the vast majority of the roads unpaved, partly due to the equestrian presence in the area.  Local residents have been deadlocked for years on creating additional roadway access to the area to relieve heavy traffic on the existing roadway network, as many residents want to maintain the peace and quiet in this rural area.  The ongoing State Road 7 road extension is one such example, as until recently, construction was delayed as many residents and environmental groups wanted to protect the local wildlife, but it has eased traffic coming in and out of the area.

Utilities
The area is not served by sewer and water systems and almost all homes have on-site well and septic systems. On-site ponds, large drainage swales, numerous canals, and houses on elevated land pads help alleviate flooding in this flat, low lying inland area.

Health care
Palms West Hospital
 Wellington ER at Westlake

See also
Loxahatchee Groves

References

External links
Indian Trail Improvement District
Town of Loxahatchee Groves
Palm Beach County

Unincorporated communities in Palm Beach County, Florida
Unincorporated communities in Florida
Census-designated places in Florida